The Penang Bridge  is a  dual carriageway toll bridge and controlled-access highway in the state of Penang, Malaysia. The bridge connects Perai on the mainland side of the state with Gelugor on the island, crossing the Penang Strait. The bridge was the first and, until 2014, the only road connection between the peninsula and the island.

The bridge was inaugurated on 14 September 1985. The current concession holder and maintainer of the bridge is PLUS Expressways. Penang Bridge Sdn Bhd was the concession holder before it was merged with the current concessionaire.

History

Chronology

Penang Bridge Widening Project
When the bridge was initially constructed, the central span had six lanes, while the rest of the bridge had four lanes. The project to widen the entire bridge to six lanes began in January 2008 and was completed in late 2009.

Features

The 225 m main span is 33 m above water, held up by four 101.5 m towers. The carriageway has 3 lanes in each direction and a speed limit of 70–80 km/h.

The bridge has an emergency layby equipped with SOS phone. Traffic CCTV and Variable Message Sign (VMS) are installed at all locations along the bridge. The bridge carries a Tenaga Nasional 132kV power cable.

Tolls

Since 1985, the Penang Bridge has been a tolled bridge. Fees are charged one way, when entering the bridge from the mainland and travelling towards Penang Island. There are no fees imposed for mainland-bound motorists coming from the island. Since 1994, the tolls have been collected by a private concession company, Penang Bridge Sdn Bhd, which has become a member company of PLUS Malaysia Berhad. Toll for motorcyclists was abolished from 1 January 2019.

Electronic toll collection
As part of an initiative to facilitate faster transactions at the Perai Toll Plaza, all toll transactions at this toll plaza on the Penang Bridge have been exclusively conducted via electronic toll collection with the use of Touch 'n Go cards and SmartTAGs since 9 September 2015.

Toll rates

List of interchange

3602B Universiti Sains Malaysia (USM) Link

Commemorative events
Commemorative postage stamps to mark the opening of the Penang Bridge on 1985 were issued by the then Malaysian Postal Services Department (now Pos Malaysia) on 15 September 1985. The denominations for these stamps were 20 sen, 40 sen, and RM 1.00.

Incidents and accidents
Over the years in its operation, the bridge has been a frequent spot for road accidents and suicides.

On 20 January 2019, two cars travelling mainland bound collided and one plunged into the Malacca Strait as a result. A search operation was launched for the submerged car and the victim was later found dead.

See also
 Sultan Abdul Halim Muadzam Shah Bridge
 North–South Expressway
 Tun Dr Lim Chong Eu Expressway

References

External links

 Penang Bridge
 Malaysian Highway Authority
 Satellite Image of Penang Bridge at Google Maps
 

1985 establishments in Malaysia
Cable-stayed bridges in Malaysia
Expressways in Malaysia
Bridges completed in 1985
Expressways and highways in Penang
Toll bridges in Malaysia
Northern Corridor Economic Region
Bridges in Penang